NGC 7679 is a lenticular galaxy with a peculiar morphology in the constellation Pisces. It is located at a distance of circa 200 million light years from Earth, which, given its apparent dimensions, means that NGC 7679 is about 60,000 light years across. It was discovered by Heinrich d'Arrest on September 23, 1864. NGC 7679 is both a starburst galaxy and a Seyfert galaxy.

Characteristics 
NGC 7679 is a barred lenticular galaxy seen face on, and is noted for its distorted shape. The galaxy has two plumes in opposite directions, possibly the result of tidal interaction with NGC 7682, and smooth outer arms. The inner region is of high surface brightness with many knots and a high star formation rate.

There is evidence of massive starburst activity in the circumnuclear region, with 35% of the stars there being aged less than 10 million years. A ring of ionised gas dominates both the optical and infrared wavelengths and is the locus of the starburst activity.

Nucleus 
The nucleus of NGC 7679 has been found to be active and has been categorised as a Seyfert galaxy. The most accepted theory for the energy source of Seyfert galaxies is the presence of an accretion disk around a supermassive black hole. NGC 7469 is believed to host a supermassive black hole whose mass is estimated to be  (106.77)  based on velocity dispersion.

The X-ray spectrum from BeppoSAX shows no significant absorption above 2 MeV and the iron Ka line was marginally detected. However, the galaxy shows signs of obstruction in visual light, as it lacks broad emission lines. Two possible reasons are the presence of dust or the accretion disk that produces X-rays is not obstructed but the broad line region is. The lack of X-ray absorption along with the presence of broad H-alpha lines but not broad H-beta mean that it cannot be easily categorised as a particular type of Seyfert galaxy.

Nearby galaxies 
NGC 7679 forms a pair with NGC 7682. NGC 7682 lies at a distance of 269.7 arcseconds, which corresponds to a projected distance of 97 kpc. The two galaxies are connected by a hydrogen bridge, a sign of a closer encounter in the past 500 million years. It is possible that the interaction of the two galaxies caused star formation in NGC 7679. A fainter galaxy has been found superimposed on the eastern arm of the galaxy, but it is actually located in the background.

See also 
 NGC 7130 - A similar active and starburst galaxy

Gallery

References

External links 

Interacting galaxies
Barred lenticular galaxies
Peculiar galaxies
Luminous infrared galaxies
Seyfert galaxies
Pisces (constellation)
7679
12618
216
71554
534